Feuille d'album may refer to:

 Album leaf, a short musical composition also known as feuille d'album or feuillet d'album
 Feuilles d'album, S.165 (Liszt), a piano piece by Franz Liszt
Feuillet d’album Op.81, a 4 hands piano piece by Camille Saint-Saëns
 Feuille d'Album (short story), a short story by Katherine Mansfield